Kevin Gilmartin is an American football coach. He is the head coach at Salve Regina University in Newport, Rhode Island, a position he had held since the 2013  Gilmartin was the offensive coordinator at Salve Regina in 2012 under head coach Bob Chesney before Chesney departed to become the head football coach at Assumption College.

Head coaching record

College football

References

External links
 Salve Regina profile

Year of birth missing (living people)
Living people
Hamilton Continentals football coaches
Hofstra Pride football coaches
Mount Ida Mustangs football coaches
Salve Regina Seahawks football coaches
Williams Ephs football players
College men's lacrosse coaches in the United States
High school football coaches in Massachusetts